Harbord Glacier Tongue is a glacier tongue forming the seaward extension of Harbord Glacier on the coast of Victoria Land, Antarctica. It was first charted by the British Antarctic Expedition under Shackleton, 1907–09, at which time it extended about  into the Ross Sea. It was named by Shackleton for A.E. Harbord, second officer of the Nimrod for the last year of the expedition.

References

Ice tongues of Antarctica
Landforms of Victoria Land
Scott Coast